= Tony Bray =

Tony Bray may refer to:

- Tony Bray (1926–2014), English stockbroker who dated Margaret Thatcher
- Anthony "Abaddon" Bray (born 1960), drummer of the English band Venom
